Empirical likelihood (EL) is a nonparametric method that requires fewer assumptions about the error distribution while retaining some of the merits in likelihood-based inference. The estimation method requires that the data are independent and identically distributed (iid). It performs well even when the distribution is asymmetric or censored. EL methods can also handle constraints and prior information on parameters. Art Owen pioneered work in this area with his 1988 paper.

Estimation Procedure
EL estimates are calculated by maximizing the empirical likelihood function subject to constraints based on the estimating function and the trivial assumption that the probability weights of the likelihood function sum to 1. This procedure is represented as:
 
subject to the constraints

The value of the theta parameter can be found by solving the Lagrangian function

There is a clear analogy between this maximization problem and the one solved for maximum entropy.

The empirical-likelihood method can also be also employed for discrete distributions:

where

Then the likelihood  is referred to as an empirical likelihood.

Empirical Likelihood Ratio (ELR) 
An empirical likelihood ratio function is defined and used to obtain confidence intervals parameter of interest θ similar to parametric likelihood ratio confidence intervals. Let L(F) be the empirical likelihood of function , then the ELR would be:

.

Consider sets of the form

.

To see this, let:

The problem can be solved by restricting to distributions F that are supported in a bounded set. It turns out to be possible to restrict attention t distributions with support in the sample, in other words, to distribution .

Other Applications 
The use of empirical likelihood is not limited to confidence intervals. In quantile estimation, an EL-based categorization procedure helps determine the shape of the true discrete distribution at level p, and also provides a way of formulating a consistent estimator. In addition, EL can be used in place of parametric likelihood to form model selection criteria.

See also
 Bootstrapping (statistics)
 Jackknife (statistics)

References

Probability distribution fitting